Tan Hong Pin is a Malaysian politician who has served as the Member of Parliament (MP) for Bakri since November 2022. He served as Member of the Johor State Executive Council (EXCO) in the Pakatan Harapan (PH) state administration under former Menteri Besar Osman Sapian from May 2018 to April 2019 and Member of the Johor State Legislative Assembly (MLA) for Skudai from May 2018 to March 2022 and Mengkibol from May 2013 to May 2018. He is a member of the Democratic Action Party (DAP), a component party of the Pakatan Harapan (PH) opposition coalition.

Election results

References

External links
 

1981 births
Living people
People from Johor
Malaysian people of Chinese descent
Democratic Action Party (Malaysia) politicians
Members of the Johor State Legislative Assembly
Johor state executive councillors
21st-century Malaysian politicians